The 1980 Boston University Terriers football team was an American football team that represented Boston University as a member of the Yankee Conference during the 1980 NCAA Division I-AA football season. In their fourth season under head coach Rick Taylor, the Terriers compiled a 9–2 record (5–0 against conference opponents), won the Yankee Conference championship, and outscored opponents by a total of 272 to 184.

Schedule

References

Boston University
Boston University Terriers football seasons
Yankee Conference football champion seasons
Boston University Terriers football